Leroy Township or Le Roy Township may refer to:

Illinois
 Leroy Township, Boone County, Illinois

Iowa
 Leroy Township, Audubon County, Iowa
 Leroy Township, Benton County, Iowa
 Le Roy Township, Bremer County, Iowa

Kansas
 Le Roy Township, Coffey County, Kansas

Michigan
 Leroy Township, Calhoun County, Michigan
 Leroy Township, Ingham County, Michigan
 Le Roy Township, Osceola County, Michigan

Minnesota
 Le Roy Township, Mower County, Minnesota

Missouri
 Leroy Township, Barton County, Missouri

Pennsylvania
 Leroy Township, Bradford County, Pennsylvania

Ohio
 LeRoy Township, Lake County, Ohio

South Dakota
 Le Roy Township, Lake County, South Dakota, in Lake County, South Dakota

Township name disambiguation pages